Confidential is the debut solo album by rapper M-1 (from the hip-hop duo dead prez). It was Released on March 21, 2006. The album is a DualDisc, with a DVD side featuring a twenty-minute documentary on the making of Confidential and the entire album in stereo sound. Confidential features guest appearances from M-1's dead prez partner Stic.man, Q-Tip, Cassandra Wilson, Styles P, Ghostface Killah, and K'naan. The album features the single "'Til We Get There", which was voted into rotation on New York's Hot 97 and was also featured on the soundtrack for the video game NBA Live 07.

Track listing

Singles
Singles: "Early"/"Comrade's Call", "'Til We Get There"/"The Beat"

Charts

Usage in media 
The track "'Til We Get There" was featured on NBA Live 07

Dead Prez albums
2006 debut albums